The 1991–92 Hellenic Football League season was the 39th in the history of the Hellenic Football League, a football competition in England.

Premier Division

The Premier Division featured 16 clubs which competed in the division last season, along with two new clubs, promoted from Division One:
Cinderford Town
Cirencester Town

League table

Division One

Division One featured 13 clubs which competed in the division last season, along with four new clubs:
Tuffley Rovers, joined from the Gloucestershire County League
Wantage Town, relegated from the Premier Division
Wollen Sports
Yarnton

League table

References

External links
 Hellenic Football League

1991-92
8